Asguard was a Belarusian heavy metal band from Mogilev, active between 1997 and 2009. Their music contains elements of melodic death metal, gothic metal and industrial metal.

History
Asguard was formed in the Autumn of 1996, in Mogilev, Belarus, with original members Alexander Afonchenko, Andrey Tselobenok and Alexander Krotov. In late 1999 and into early 2000, the band had written and recorded their first official debut entitled Summis Desiderantess Effectibus for the Ukraine label Bloodhead Productions.

Dreamslave... Awakening
The recording of Dreamslave... Awakening was planned for the end of spring. The album was recorded, mixed and mastered in Freedman Studio.

Members

Current members
Alexander Afonchenko - Vocals, bass
Andrey Tselobenok - Guitar
Oleg Maslakov - Guitar
Sergey “Dead” Tselobenok - Drums
Mikhail Kopychko - Keyboards, electronics

Former members
Yuri Yurchenko - Drums (on “In The Darkness Of The Night”, “Summis Desiderantes Effectibus” & “Wikka”)
Sergey Nickolaenko - Keyboards (on “Black Fire Land”)
Alexander Krotov - Guitar (on “In The Darkness Of The Night”)
Sergey Tsvikevich - Keyboards, orchestral arrangement (on “Dreamslave”)
Tatjana Lazarjkova - Cello (on “Dreamslave”)
Andrey Polovchenia - Vargan, bagpipe & surma (on “Dreamslave”)
Dmitriy Laptenok - Keyboards, electronics

Discography

Studio albums

EPs

References

Musical groups established in 1997
Belarusian heavy metal musical groups
Melodic death metal musical groups
Musical quintets